Wanjok (also known as Wanyjok) is a town in the Aweil East County, Republic of South Sudan.

History

Formerly Wanyjok was the state of Northern Bahr El Gazhel. It became the capital of the new state, Aweil East, when the president Salva Kiir created new states in South Sudan.

Educational people
The following people are the most regarded in the state:
 Madut Aluk

Military people
 Paul Malong Awan

See also
 Aweil East State

References

External links

States of South Sudan
State capitals in South Sudan